The Agi Cabul is a river in Constanța County, Romania. It discharges into the Danube–Black Sea Canal in Medgidia.

References

Rivers of Constanța County
Rivers of Romania